The Aromanian Missal ( or) is an anonymous Aromanian-language instructive liturgical book (missal) variously referred to as dating from the beginning, the first half, the middle and the second half of the 18th century. It is the first extensive text in Aromanian, and includes translations of sermons and other religious texts into Aromanian. The Aromanian Missal is believed to have been written in Moscopole (or ), once a prosperous Aromanian city, and uses the Greek alphabet due to archaic forms of Greek being considered the appropriate language for high and literary functions in those times within the Balkans. In recent times, the text of the liturgy has begun to circulate more actively among the Aromanians in Albania with support from the Aromanian diaspora. In a 2002 study on the Aromanians, German researcher Thede Kahl stated that priest Thomai sang this Aromanian-language liturgy at the St. Nicholas Church of Moscopole.

The Aromanian Missal was discovered in 1939 by Ilo Mitkë Qafëzezi, a scholar and writer of mixed Albanian–Aromanian origins, in the archives of the National Library of Albania in Tirana. In a 1962 monograph, the Aromanian linguist  formally published the contents of the missal as the Liturghier aromânesc ("Aromanian Missal").

The Aromanian Missal is one of the earliest Aromanian-language works along with the also anonymous Codex Dimonie and the publications of Theodore Kavalliotis, Daniel Moscopolites and Constantin Ucuta. Caragiu Marioțeanu described the Aromanian language of the missal as being "relatively unitary, systematic, and consistent, and closer to the language used by the writers from the end of the 19th century". She also highlighted that it is the only Aromanian-language book for divine service without Romanian or newly-introduced Latin influences.


References

Citations

Bibliography

External links
 , modern digitalized version in Latin script 

Aromanian manuscripts
History of the Aromanians
Moscopole
Anonymous works
Eastern Orthodox liturgical books
18th-century Christian texts
18th-century manuscripts
Missals